Félix Sánchez Bas (born 13 December 1975) is a Spanish football coach, who is the current coach of the Ecuador national football team.

He has spent most of his career in Qatar, first with the national youth teams until being appointed to the senior team in 2017. His side won the 2019 AFC Asian Cup and were semi-finalists at the 2021 CONCACAF Gold Cup.

Career
An FC Barcelona youth coach, Sánchez moved to Qatar in 2006 and joined Aspire Academy. In 2013, he was appointed coach of the Qatar under-19 side, winning the following year's AFC U-19 Championship.

On 3 July 2017, after a spell with the under-20s and under-23s, Sánchez replaced Jorge Fossati at the helm of the senior side. On his debut on 16 August, he won 1–0 against Andorra in a friendly at St George's Park in England. The side finished the year without qualifying for the 2018 FIFA World Cup, and were eliminated from the group stage of the 23rd Arabian Gulf Cup.

Sánchez led Qatar to the AFC Asian Cup title for the first time in 2019 tournament, having won all three group matches and knockout stage matches including a 3–1 win over Japan in the final, scoring 19 times and conceding only once. In May that year, he signed a new contract until the 2022 FIFA World Cup, to be hosted by Qatar. Weeks later, the team were invitees to the 2019 Copa América in Brazil, being knocked out in the group. In December, at the 24th Arabian Gulf Cup on home soil, the side reached the semi-finals.

Qatar were also invited to the 2021 CONCACAF Gold Cup in the United States, where the hosts eliminated them 1–0 in the semi-finals. At the end of the year, his side made it to the semi-finals of the inaugural FIFA Arab Cup on home turf, eventually finishing third. In the 2022 FIFA World Cup hosted by Qatar, the national team lost all their matches in Group A, to become the worst performing host nation in the history of the competition. His contract with Qatar expired on 31 December of the same year and was not renewed.

On 11 March 2023, the Ecuadorian Football Federation announced the appointment of Sanchez as head coach of the Ecuadorian national football team through their social media platforms.

Managerial statistics

Honours
Qatar U19
 AFC U-19 Championship: 2014

Qatar U23
 AFC U-23 Championship third place: 2018

Qatar
 AFC Asian Cup: 2019

References

External links

1975 births
Living people
Sportspeople from Barcelona
Spanish football managers
FC Barcelona non-playing staff
Aspire Academy managers
Qatar national football team managers
Ecuador national football team managers
Spanish expatriate football managers
Spanish expatriate sportspeople in Qatar
2019 AFC Asian Cup managers
2019 Copa América managers
2021 CONCACAF Gold Cup managers
AFC Asian Cup-winning managers
2022 FIFA World Cup managers
Association football coaches
Expatriate football managers in Ecuador